In public transport, Route 1 may refer to:

Route 1 (MTA Maryland), a bus route in Baltimore, Maryland
Barcelona Metro line 1
Line 1 (Beijing Subway)
Line 1 (Hangzhou Metro)
Citybus Route 1 in Hong Kong
KMB Route 1 in Hong Kong
London Buses route 1
Manila LRT Yellow Line
Line 1 Green (Montreal Metro)
1 (New York City Subway service)
Seoul Subway Line 1
Shanghai Metro Line 1
Line 1 (Shenzhen Metro)
Melbourne tram route 1
Line 1 Yonge-University, in Toronto
Transjakarta Corridor 1 Blok M-Kota

1